South Carolina gained one representative as a result of the 1810 Census, increasing from 8 seats to 9. Its elections were held October 12–13, 1812.

See also 
 United States House of Representatives elections, 1812 and 1813
 List of United States representatives from South Carolina

Notes

References 

1812
South Carolina
United States House of Representatives